Martin Damm and Cyril Suk were the defending champions, but Damm did not participate this year.  Suk partnered Pavel Vízner, losing in the semifinals.

Mark Knowles and Daniel Nestor won the title, defeating Jonathan Erlich and Andy Ram 5–3, 5–4(7–4) in the final.

Seeds

  Mark Knowles /  Daniel Nestor (champions)
  Jonathan Erlich /  Andy Ram (final)
  Cyril Suk /  Pavel Vízner (semifinals)
  Gastón Etlis /  Martín Rodríguez (semifinals)

Draw

Draw

External links
 Draw

Vienna Open
2005 ATP Tour